Social nudity is the practice of nudity in relatively public settings not restricted by gender. This occurs both in public spaces and on commercial property, such as at a naturist resort.

Some isolated indigenous nudity still exists in the tropics, though this way of life is highly endangered, as is male nude swimming in public, which used to be very commonplace in Western civilization. Modern European-style naturism began around the turn of the 20th century in British India and Northern Germany, and it was brought to the United States by German immigrants in the 1930s.

Terminology

The usage and definition of terms relating to social nudity varies geographically and historically. In the book Cinema Au Naturel, Mark Storey states: "two related terms that we will continually run across are nudist and naturist. Although the meanings of the two terms are virtually identical, they often have different connotations for those who prefer one to the other. In America, people who believe that it is physically, socially, emotionally, and perhaps spiritually healthy to go about fully nude individually and in groups of mixed gender, wherever the weather permits and others are not offended, generally refer to themselves as "nudists". In Europe, such people more often than not, refer to themselves as "naturists".

Ethical Naturism vs Recreational Naturism is a concept first introduced by Stéphane Deschênes in the April 2011 episode of The Naturist Living Show Podcast. which attempts to create a taxonomy that classifies the various types of naturists/nudists. Ethical Naturists are described as seeing themselves as part of a philosophy with ethical and moral aspects while recreational nudists are simply participating in a leisure activity that involves nudity.

Many people casually enjoy social nudity without adhering to any term and without associating with any traditional naturist, nudist or FKK organization or any other groups or movements. That is common, for example on nude beaches and other forms of public nudity, such as seen at cultural events like Burning Man or clothing-optional bike rides.

Several activists, such as Vincent Bethell, claim that associations to promote naturism or nudism are unnecessary, leading only to "nudity in tolerated ghettos". Activist Daniel Johnson believes that labels and affiliations overly complicate a relatively simple phenomenon, alienate others from a fear of over-commitment or undesirable stereotypes, and thus get in the way of integrating nudity into everyday life.

Legal concerns

Public Nudity
Public nudity in England and Wales is permitted anywhere provided it is not done with the intention to cause harassment, alarm or distress.

Naturism was excluded from the Sexual Offences Act 2003 (SOA) for England and Wales, under Section 66. Police and the Crown Prosecution Service were not adequately informed, and any report of nudity was then prosecuted under Section 5 of The Public Order Act 1986. The Equality Act 2010 gave Naturists a protected status and use of the Public Order Act route was defeated in the courts in 2013.

Some laws target naturism. In the U.S. State of Arkansas, nudism is illegal beyond the immediate family unit, even on private property. It is also a crime to "promote" or "advocate" nudism.

Photography

The American Association for Nude Recreation (AANR) issues a (US specific) photo release form to allow people to give permission for the publication of photos of themselves or their children.

Children

Diversity

Age
As of 1998, many naturist and nudist clubs in the US had few young members. However, in France the number of younger naturists was increasing during the 2010s.

Ethnicity

Organized social nudity usually attracts more people of European ethnic backgrounds. This may be due to it becoming a social movement in Europe, before spreading to other parts of the world. Other reasons include the fact that most resorts are located far from the cities, and have done little to promote themselves to those of non-European ethnic backgrounds.

If someone is from an ethnicity whose recent ancestors had no problem with public nudity (parts of Africa, Asia, pre-European Americas, Australia, and the Pacific Islands), it might be thought of as being "primitive" by modern standards, and lacking in social status. (i.e. "Only the poorest of the poor would go about without clothing.") This contrasts with the more Western attitude that nudity and sexuality are related, but nonetheless causes them to shy away from social nudity.

Other issues

Staring
In the early days of naturism in the U.S. (1930s–1950s), the rules at many resorts stipulated that when conversing, you must only look at each other face to face.

In the 1960s and 1970s, nudist royalty pageants and "Miss Nude" contests were held by some naturist clubs in the US and Canada. The former were open to men, women and children and were judged on the basis of audience applause, while the latter were typically open to women aged between 18 and 30 and were judged by panels drawn from the local community, businesses and the media as well as minor celebrities.

Sexual well-being
Smith and King pose the following points in their 2009 peer reviewed paper entitled Naturism and Sexuality: Broadening our approach to sexual well-being:

 Mainstream naturism relies on discriminatory and dishonest practices to manage sexuality, which limits the diversity of the naturist population, and presents an image and culture that lacks integrity and transparency.
 Naturist environments can offer unique public spaces to explore sexual feelings and experiences that may be repressed or limited in conventional public spaces and sexual relationships.
 Mainstream naturism may pathologize (i.e. treat as psychologically abnormal or unhealthy) those who enjoy the eroticism of nudity.

Spontaneous erections
The world's largest naturist resort at Cap d'Agde in France is nonchalant about erections. The American Association for Nude Recreation suggests covering the waist with a towel, lying on one's stomach, or going into the swimming pool.

See also

Nude swimming
Nudity and sexuality
Nudity in religion

References

Bibliography

Further reading
Storey, Mark Social Nudity, Sexual Attraction, and Respect Nude & Natural magazine, 24.3 Spring 2005.
Storey, Mark Children, Social Nudity and Academic Research Nude & Natural magazine, 23.4 Summer 2004.
Storey, Mark Children, Social Nudity and Scholarly Study

External links
 UK Public Nudity Guidance CPS
 GoTopless.Org: A Raelian website (US) advocating female topless equality
 Social Nudity And The Law

Naturism
Social issues